Wamathai Samuel Githaiga is a Kenyan politician who served as the  2nd governor of Nyeri County He assumed office on 24 February 2017 after the death of Nderitu Gachagua. He served as deputy governor to Gachagua having been elected on a GNU party ticket in the 2013 Kenyan General elections. Wamathai assumed office as per the Governor succession act of the Kenyan Constitution.

Gachagua died while undergoing treatment at a London hospital, United Kingdom.

Born in Muruguru Village, Nyeri County. Githaiga is a graduate of the University of Nairobi and Massachusetts Institute of Technology.

Wamathai was defeated by Dr Wahome Gakuru in the 2017 general election and has since retired from active politics

References

Living people
County Governors of Kenya
1951 births
People from Nyeri County
University of Nairobi alumni